This article details the Warrington Wolves Rugby League Football Club's 2016 season. This is the Wolves' 21st consecutive season in the Super League.

Pre season friendlies

Table

To be inserted.

Super League

Key

Regular season

Super 8's

Play-offs

Player appearances

 = Injured

 = Suspended

Challenge Cup

Player appearances

2016 squad statistics

 Appearances and points include (Super League, Challenge Cup and Play-offs) as of 22 April 2016.

 = Injured
 = Suspended

2016 transfers in/out

In

Out

References

External links
Warrington Wolves Website
Warrington Wolves - SL Website

Warrington Wolves seasons
Super League XXI by club